In the United States, the Twenty-first Amendment to the United States Constitution grants each state and territory the power to regulate intoxicating liquors within their jurisdiction. As such, laws pertaining to the production, sale, distribution, and consumption of alcoholic drinks vary significantly across the country.

On July 17, 1984,  the National Minimum Drinking Age Act was enacted. The Act requires all states to either set their minimum age to purchase alcoholic beverages and the minimum age to possess  alcoholic beverages in public to no lower than 21 years of age or lose 10% (Changed to 8% in 2012) of their allocated federal highway funding if the minimum age for the aforementioned is lower than 21 years of age. As of July 1988, all 50 states and the District of Columbia had a minimum purchase age of 21, with some grandfather clauses, and with the exception of Louisiana's complicated legal situation that was not resolved until July 2, 1996. Prior to 1988, the minimum purchase age varied by jurisdiction. After enactment of the Act, states not in compliance had a portion of their federal highway budget withheld. South Dakota and Wyoming were the final two states to comply, in mid-1988. Since the Act does not restrict the minimum drinking age or the minimum age to possess alcohol in private, most states continue to allow those under 21 to drink in certain circumstances. Examples are some states like Tennessee and Washington, which allow those under 21 to drink for religious purposes. States including Oregon and New York allow those under 21 to drink on private non-alcohol selling premises. Some states like Ohio allow under 21 to drink in private and public including bars and restaurants if accompanied by parents, guardians, or spouse that is 21 or older.

The National Highway System Designation Act of 1995 requires all states to impose a "zero-tolerance law" prohibiting drivers under 21 years of age from operating a motor vehicle with at least 0.02% blood alcohol content to discourage underage drinking. Any state that did not comply would have up to 10 percent of its federal highway funding withheld, the same strategy used to compel states into raising their drinking age to 21.

Unlike on the mainland, the U.S. territories of Puerto Rico and the U.S. Virgin Islands have a minimum purchasing age and drinking age of 18 since the language of the Act only applies the provisions of the Act to states. The minimum purchase age is 21 in the Northern Mariana Islands, Guam, American Samoa, and U.S. Minor Outlying Islands.

U.S. military reservations are exempt under federal law from state, county, and locally enacted alcohol laws. Class Six stores in a base exchange facility, officers' or NCO clubs, as well as other military commissaries which are located on a military reservation, may sell and serve alcoholic beverages at any time during their prescribed hours of operation to authorized patrons.  While the installation commander is free to set the drinking age, with some exceptions, most stateside military bases have a drinking age that mirrors the local community.

Individual states remain free to restrict or prohibit the manufacture of beer, mead, hard cider, wine, and other fermented alcoholic beverages at home. Homebrewing beer became legal in all 50 states in 2013 as the governors of Mississippi and Alabama both signed bills legalizing homebrewing that year. The Alabama bill went into effect on May 9, and the Mississippi bill went into effect on July 1. Because alcohol is taxed by the federal government via excise taxes, homebrewers are prohibited from selling any beer they brew. This similarly applies in most Western countries. In 1979, President Jimmy Carter signed into law a bill allowing home beers, which was at the time not permitted without paying the excise taxes as a holdover from the prohibition of alcoholic beverages (repealed in 1933). This change also exempted home brewers from posting a "penal bond" (which is currently $1000.00).

Production of distilled alcohols is regulated at the national level under USC Title 26 subtitle E Ch51. Numerous requirements must be met to do so, and production carries an excise tax. Owning or operating a distillation apparatus without filing the proper paperwork and paying the taxes carries federal criminal penalties.

In land or property that is being rented or owned by the federal government, state, federal district, and territory alcohol laws do not apply. Instead, only laws made by the federal government apply.



Table

Alabama–Hawaii

Idaho–Massachusetts

Michigan–New Mexico

New York–South Dakota

Tennessee–Wyoming, Puerto Rico

See also
 Alcohol consumption by youth in the United States
 Alcohol exclusion laws
 Blue laws in the United States
 Drunk driving in the United States
 Dry county
 Granholm v. Heald
 Last call
 Legal drinking age controversy in the United States
 Liquor store
 List of dry communities by U.S. state
 Shoulder tap (alcohol)
 United States open container laws
 Wine shipping laws in the United States
 U.S. history of alcohol minimum purchase age by state

Footnotes

References

External links
 
 National Alcohol Beverage Control Association
 Alcohol Policy Information System, U.S. National Institute of Health
 Federation of Tax Administrators - State Excise Taxes 
 National Restaurant Association - State laws on alcohol sales (Word document)
 Alcohol and Public Health FAQ, U.S. Center for Disease Control and Prevention

 

United States
State law in the United States
States of the United States law-related lists
United States law-related lists